In geometry, a cleaver of a triangle is a line segment that bisects the perimeter of the triangle and has one endpoint at the midpoint of one of the three sides. They are not to be confused with splitters, which also bisect the perimeter, but with an endpoint on one of the triangle's vertices instead of its sides.

Construction
Each cleaver through the midpoint of one of the sides of a triangle is parallel to the angle bisectors at the opposite vertex of the triangle.

The broken chord theorem of Archimedes provides another construction of the cleaver.

Related figures
The three cleavers concur at a point, the center of the Spieker circle.

See also 
Splitter (geometry)

References

External links

Straight lines defined for a triangle